Morgane Edvige (born 24 April 1996) is a French model and beauty pageant titleholder who was the 1st Runner-Up at Miss France 2016 and represented France at Miss World 2016 in United States.

Personal life
Morgane works as a model in France.

Pageantry

Miss France 2016
On 25 September 2015, she went on to be crowned Miss Martinique 2015 in Fort-de-France and received the right to represent Martinique in Miss France 2016. 
On 19 December 2015 she competed as Miss Martinique at Miss France 2016 where she placed 1st Runner-Up. The winner, Iris Mittenaere, Miss Nord - Pas-de-Calais, was crowned Miss Universe 2016 in January 2017.

Miss World 2016
Morgane represented France at Miss World 2016 in Washington, D.C. where she placed in the Top 20. She was Top 5 in the Top Model competition.

References

External links
  Official site

1996 births
Living people
Martiniquais female models
French beauty pageant winners
French female models
French people of Martiniquais descent
Miss World 2016 delegates